The 1909 Franklin & Marshall football team was an American football team that represented Franklin & Marshall College during the 1909 college football season. The team compiled a 9–1 record.  Jack Hollenback, a former Penn player, was the team's head coach. O. Webster Saylor was the team captain and played at the tackle position.

Schedule

References

Franklin and Marshall
Franklin & Marshall Diplomats football seasons
Franklin and Marshall football